Hiram Harrison Lowry (May 29, 1843 – January 13, 1924) was an educator, Methodist clergyman and college president in China.

Early life 

Lowry was born on May 29, 1843 in Zanesville, Ohio, to Hiram and Margaret née Speare. He graduated from the Ohio Wesleyan University, and received the degrees of Bachelor and Master of Arts and Doctor of Divinity. In 1862-63 Lowry served during the American Civil War in the ninety-seventh regiment of the Ohio Volunteer Infantry. In 1867 he was ordained to the ministry of the Methodist Episcopal Church and was sent out to China.

China 

On October 10, 1867, Lowry arrived with his wife, Parthenia Nicholson, in Foochow, where they labored till 1869. In 1869 he was sent to Peking, where the foundations of the work of the North China Mission was laid. In 1870, Lowry built up the first Methodist church in Northern China, the Asbury Church (today the Chongwenmen Church in Beijing), named after the American Methodist Bishop Francis Asbury. From 1873 to 1893, Lowry served as superintendent of North China Mission (until it became the North China Annual Conference) and since 1914 president of Huiwen University, the precursor of Yenching University. From 1894 until it became a union institution, he was president of Huiwen University, later be part of Yenching University, where he trained thousands of young Chinese who are now active in Christian work, in business, the professions and in government.

Lowry retired in 1922 and died in Peking on January 13, 1924. He was survived by six children: George Davis Lowry, Edward Kinsley Lowry, Fanny May Lowry, Grace Ernestine (Lowry) Hooper, Ernest Wilbur Lowry, and Mabel Annetta (Lowry) Dobson.

References
 Shavit, David (1990): The United States in Asia: A Historical Dictionary
 History of Chongwenmen Church 
 "Reports of Deaths of American Citizens Abroad 1924;" "US Consular Registration Certificates 1910;" "US Passport Applications 1916" via Find a Grave.

1843 births
1924 deaths
Ohio Wesleyan University alumni
Methodist writers
Christian missionaries in Fujian
Methodist missionaries in China
American expatriates in China
American Methodist missionaries